Costa Coffee is a British coffeehouse chain with headquarters in Dunstable, England.

Costa Coffee was founded in London in 1971 by Sergio Costa as a wholesale operation supplying roasted coffee to caterers and specialist Italian coffee shops. It was acquired by Whitbread in 1995, sold in 2019 to The Coca-Cola Company in a deal worth £3.9bn, and has grown to 3,401 stores across 31 countries and 18,412 employees. The business has 2,121 UK restaurants, over 6,000 Costa Express vending facilities and a further 1,280 outlets overseas, including 460 in China.

Coca-Cola  acquired Costa from parent company Whitbread PLC for US$5.1 billion on 3 January 2019, providing a coffee platform across parts of Europe, Asia Pacific, the Middle East, and Africa.

Costa is the second largest coffeehouse chain in the world, and the largest in the UK.

History

Sergio Costa founded a coffee roastery in Fenchurch Street, London, in 1971, supplying local caterers. The family had moved to England from Parma, Italy, in the 1950s. Costa branched out to selling coffee and opened their first store in Vauxhall Bridge Road, London in 1981.

By 1995, the Costa Coffee chain had 41 stores in UK, and was acquired by Whitbread, the UK's largest hotel and coffee shop operator, becoming a wholly owned subsidiary. In 2009, Costa opened its 1,000th store in Cardiff. In December 2009, Costa Coffee agreed to acquire the Polish chain Coffeeheaven for £36million, adding 79 stores in central and eastern Europe.

The company's products (such as its coffee and drinks) were sold in Brewers Fayre and Beefeater until it was subsequently purchased by the Coca-Cola Company from Whitbread. 

In 2018, Whitbread faced pressure from two of its largest shareholders, activist group Elliott Advisers and hedge fund Sachem Head, to sell or demerge Costa Coffee, the theory being that the individual businesses would be worth much more than the one company alone. On 25 April 2018, Whitbread announced its intention to fully demerge Costa within two years. On 3 January 2019 the Coca-Cola Company purchased Costa Coffee for $4.9 billion.

In November 2019,  Dominic Paul was succeeded as CEO of the company by Jill McDonald. In March 2020, all UK coffee shops were closed indefinitely due to the COVID-19 pandemic. In late May some branches reopened for takeaway or drive-through orders. In 2022, Costa Coffee discontinued the Costa Book Awards that Whitbread had started 51 years earlier.

Products

Costa branches sell hot and cold drinks, sandwiches, cakes and pastries, and snacks. In 2020, the brand collaborated with three chocolate brands (Quality Street, After Eight and Terry's) for some of their limited-edition Christmas drinks.

Costa moved its roastery from Lambeth to Basildon, Essex, in May 2017 with an investment of £38million, increasing their annual coffee-roasting capacity from 11,000 to 45,000 tonnes.

In 2020, Costa Coffee introduced canned coffee and iced coffee.

Costa Coffee employs Gennaro Pelliccia as a coffee taster, who had his tongue insured for £10m with Lloyd's of London in 2009.

Operations

Locations

Costa Coffee operates 2,467 outlets in the United Kingdom . Overseas, it operates 1,413 stores in 32 countries. The first Costa store outside the UK opened in the United Arab Emirates in 1999, and, in September 2017, was the first coffee shop worldwide to start delivering coffee via drones.

Costa Coffee's Bedfordshire headquarters are next to those of Whitbread.

Costa Express
Following Whitbread's £59.5m acquisition of Coffee Nation, a chain of coffee machines, the machines were re-branded as Costa Express. The company planned to expand to hospitals, universities and transport interchanges. In Denmark, Costa Express machines are located in Shell stations; they had previously also been in Shell Canada. In the UK, many grocery store chain SPAR petrol station stores have Costa Express machines.

World distribution

, Costa Coffee was available on 4 continents in 38 countries, with 3,884 total locations.

Controversies

On 19 August 2019, Costa Coffee attracted media attention due to claims of unfair deductions from the pay of its employees. Reports stated that current and former employees had £200 deducted from their pay for training, as well as additional deductions being levied for till discrepancies and running costs. Claims of unfair deductions were triggered by a Twitter post suggesting that staff at a Costa store were forced to reimburse money lost to scammers who came into the store. Trying to distance themselves from the controversy, Costa said contracts for franchise stores were managed by franchisees, and that some staff contracts did have "clauses relating to deductions".

Only four days later, additional claims appeared in the media that Costa Coffee franchise workers were "not treated like humans". The report included managers' alleged refusal to pay for sickness, annual leave, or working outside contracted hours, and retaining tips. It cited an anonymous former employee at a store under Goldex Essex Investments Ltd who claimed that almost £1,000 of their holiday pay was deducted from their salary, despite being contracted to work 48 hours a week. The report said that baristas and employees at managerial level had complained about the numerous deductions outlined in Costa Coffee franchisees' contracts. A former manager was quoted as saying she had £150 deducted from her wages after having been five minutes late opening the store. Other fines outlined in the contracts were for uniform that were damaged when returned to the employer, excessive waste and till discrepancies. A Costa Coffee spokesperson responded that an independent audit had been launched.

In January 2023, an investigation by animal rights group Viva! found cows that were emaciated, lame and struggling to walk on a farm that supplies Costa Coffee. The animals were also handled roughly, with one being hit in the udder and others being slapped or having their heads pushed, footage suggested.

Costa Book Awards

Costa Coffee has been the sponsor of the Costa Book Awards (formerly the Whitbread Book Awards) since 2006. On 10 June 2022 they announced this would end.

See also

 List of coffeehouse chains

References

External links

 

1971 establishments in England
British companies established in 1971
Restaurants established in 1971
1995 mergers and acquisitions
2019 mergers and acquisitions
Coffee brands
Coca-Cola acquisitions
Coffeehouses and cafés in the United Kingdom
Companies based in Bedfordshire
Dunstable
Whitbread former divisions and subsidiaries
British subsidiaries of foreign companies